Isle of Wight is a constituency represented in the House of Commons of the UK Parliament since 2017 by Bob Seely, a Conservative.

Created by the Great Reform Act for the 1832 general election, it covers the whole of the Isle of Wight. It had the largest electorate of any constituency at the 2019 general election.

Boundaries

The Isle of Wight has been a single seat of the House of Commons since 1832. The island is linked by ferry crossings from four points (five points if counting Cowes and East Cowes separately) to three points in Hampshire: Lymington, Southampton and Portsmouth.

Its electorate of 113,021 at the 2019 general election is the largest in the UK, more than 50% above the UK average: 73,181, and five times the size of the smallest seat: Na h-Eileanan an Iar, formerly known as the Western Isles.

One or two seats problem
The reviews of the Boundary Commission for England since 1954 have consulted locally on splitting the island into two seats (and included occasional proposals for a seat crossing the Solent onto the mainland) but met an overall distaste by the independent commissioners and most consultees and consultation respondents. The consensus of varying panels of Boundary Commissioners, party-interested and neutral commentators is that the island would be best represented by one MP.  The Commissioners did make mention perfunctorily of their duty by law to avoid such an extent of malapportionment (termed by most commissioners "leaving the island somewhat oversized").  One problem the independent body cited in 2008 was a difficulty of dividing the island in two in a way that would be acceptable to all major interests. The arbitrary division line problem is routinely encountered in those council areas which have no rural elements or natural divides.

Eventually, under the Parliamentary Voting System and Constituencies Act 2011, which proposed that the total number of constituencies in the UK Parliament should be reduced from 650 to 600, it was specified that the Isle of Wight should comprise two "protected" seats, meaning that their electorates did not have to be within the statutory range of ±5%. The 2011 Act was amended by the Parliamentary Constituencies Act 2020 which reversed the decrease in the total number of seats but retained the two protected seats for the Isle of Wight.

Proposed boundary changes 

Following the abandonment of the Sixth Periodic Review (the 2018 review), the Boundary Commission for England formally launched the 2023 Review on 5 January 2021. Initial proposals were published on 8 June 2021 and, following two periods of public consultation, revised proposals were published on 8 November 2022. Final proposals will be published by 1 July 2023.

The commission has proposed splitting the island into Isle of Wight East (electorate 56,805) and Isle of Wight West (electorate 54, 911).

History
Before the Reform Act 1832 (apart from the First Protectorate Parliament (1654–1655), when a whole island constituency existed) the island was usually represented by three Parliamentary boroughs: Newport, Newtown, and Yarmouth, each electing two MPs. The county electorate of the island, which included freeholders qualified by property, was represented by the two MPs for Hampshire. The Reform Act abolished the Newtown and Yarmouth parliamentary boroughs, and a single-member county division of Hampshire was created for the island. The separate and overlapping Newport representation was reduced to one MP in 1868 and finally abolished in 1885. Since then, the whole of the Isle of Wight has been represented by one constituency.

The constituency has traditionally been a battleground between the Conservatives and the Liberal Democrats and their predecessors. The seat was held by a Liberal from 1974 until 1987, a Conservative until 1997, a Liberal Democrat until 2001, and a Conservative since then.

At the 2015 election, the incumbent Conservative scored one of his party's largest swings against the Liberal Democrats whose candidate finished in fifth place.

In the 2017 general election, Nick Belfitt, the Liberal Democrat candidate, became the youngest ever candidate to stand for the seat at the age of 23.

At the December 2019 general election the Liberal Democrats agreed to stand aside and support the Green Party candidate as part the Unite to Remain agreement between the two parties and Plaid Cymru involving 60 constituencies in England and Wales, with the purpose of increasing the chances of candidates who supported remaining in the European Union.

Members of Parliament

Pre 1832
 1654: Lord Lisle; William Sydenham
 1830–1831: Horrace Twiss

Since 1832

Elections

Elections in the 2010s

Elections in the 2000s

Elections in the 1990s

Elections in the 1980s

Elections in the 1970s

Elections in the 1960s

Elections in the 1950s

Elections in the 1940s

General Election 1939–40

Another general election was required to take place before the end of 1940. The political parties had been making preparations for an election to take place from 1939 and by the end of this year, the following candidates had been selected; 
Conservative: Peter Macdonald
Labour: Robert Arthur Lyster
Liberal: Helen de Guerry Browne

Elections in the 1930s

Elections in the 1920s

Elections in the 1910s

Another General Election was required to take place before the end of 1915. The political parties had been making preparations for an election to take place and by July 1914, the following candidates had been selected; 
Unionist: Douglas Hall
Liberal: Godfrey Baring

Elections in the 1900s

Elections in the 1890s

Elections in the 1880s

 Caused by Webster's appointment as Attorney General of England and Wales.

Elections in the 1870s

 Caused by Simeon's death.

Elections in the 1860s

Elections in the 1850s

 Caused by Simeon's resignation after he converted from Anglicanism to Catholicism.

Elections in the 1840s

Elections in the 1830s

See also
 Politics of the Isle of Wight
 List of parliamentary constituencies in the South East (region)
 List of United Kingdom Parliament constituencies

Notes

External links 
Politics Resources (Election results from 1922 onwards)
Electoral Calculus (Election results from 1955 onwards)
2017 Election House of Commons Library 2017 Election report
A Vision Of Britain Through Time (Constituency elector numbers)

References

Politics of the Isle of Wight
Parliamentary constituencies in South East England
Constituencies of the Parliament of the United Kingdom established in 1832